Guézon is a town in western Ivory Coast. It is a sub-prefecture of Duékoué Department in Guémon Region, Montagnes District.

Guézon was a commune until March 2012, when it became one of 1126 communes nationwide that were abolished.

In 2021, the population of the sub-prefecture of Guézon was 56,435.

Villages
The eleven villages of the sub-prefecture of Guézon and their population in 2014 are:

Notes

Sub-prefectures of Guémon
Former communes of Ivory Coast